The Chile women's national under-16 and under-17 basketball team is a national basketball team of Chile, administered by the Federación de Basquetbol de Chile.

It represents the country in international under-16 and under-17 (under age 16 and under age 17) women's basketball competitions.

Competitive record

Under-17 World Cup
The team qualified for the 2020 FIBA Under-17 Women's Basketball World Cup, its most noteworthy accomplishment so far.

Americas Under-16 Championship
The team qualified on two occasions.

In 2021, Chile won their final match of group play to move to 1-2 record. Major performances came from Vania Vega who recorded 17 points, 7 rebounds and 5 steals in the win over Mexico.

South American U17 Championship
In the past, the team appeared at the 2016 South American U17 Championship for Women.

See also
Chile women's national basketball team
Chile women's national under-19 basketball team
Chile men's national under-17 basketball team

References

External links
 Archived records of Chile team participations

under
Women's national under-17 basketball teams